Kinchbus is a bus operator in Loughborough, England. Since 1998 it has been a subsidiary of the Wellglade Group.

History

Kinchbus was founded in 1987 by former Leicester City Football Club director Gilbert Kinch trading as GK Kinch and based in Barrow Upon Soar. Before moving into local bus services, Kinch had operated coaches from nearby Mountsorrel since at least 1972. In the early 1990s Kinchbus began to expand with services around Leicestershire and Nottinghamshire, including the purchase of Loughborough Bus and Coach from Midland Fox, giving the company its presence in Loughborough. In 1998 Kinchbus was sold to the Wellglade Group.

Since 2008 Kinchbus has operated the Skylink service between Derby and Loughborough. In April 2009 after the withdrawal of the Arriva Midlands service it was extended into Leicester via the A6.

In January 2013, Kinchbus reintroduced service 9 between Loughborough and Nottingham, following the collapse of Premiere Travel

During September 2022, it was announced that current managing director Jeff Counsell will retire in February 2023 and will be succeeded by Tom Morgan who is the current commercial director for Kinchbus and fellow Wellglade Group subsidiary Trentbarton.

Services
Kinchbus are the main provider of bus services within the Loughborough area alongside services to Nottingham and Leicester running 7 days a week, Kinchbus also provide Skylink services between Leicester and Derby via East Midlands Airport.

Service Cutbacks
In August 2022, Kinchbus announced their long established number 2 service between Loughborough and Leicester would be cut back to Sileby from 4 September 2022 as a result of driver shortages and lower passenger numbers. 

As part of a Wellglade Group post Covid-19 pandemic review of services across the network from 2 October 2022, Skylink will no longer serve Long Whatton and Diseworth

Fleet
As of September 2022, the fleet consists of 35 buses of varying models, including twelve Alexander-Dennis Enviro200MMCs and ten Optare Solos. 

During 2020, Kinchbus upgraded services 11/12 with Optare Versas which were transferred from Trent Barton and replaced Optare Tempos which were used on the service since new in 2007, As a result of the now abandoned Leicester clean air zone, the Skylink fleet was also upgraded with 12 new Enviro200 MMCs which replaced a fleet of eleven Mercedes-Benz Citaros.

Liveries
Most buses wear a two-tone yellow and blue livery, split diagonally along the side of the bus, with the yellow in front. This livery was originally introduced in 2007, and was given a facelift in 2013 starting with the vehicles used on Kinchbus 9. Most of Kinchbus's services are route-branded, as in common with their sister company, Trentbarton. Skylink buses are the exception to branding on the standard livery as they are mostly yellow with branding for the service.

See also
Trentbarton
List of bus operators of the United Kingdom

References

External links

Kinchbus official website

Bus operators in Derbyshire
Bus operators in Leicestershire
Bus operators in Nottinghamshire
Companies based in Leicestershire
Transport in Leicestershire
1987 establishments in England